Benjamin Yavuzsoy (born 4 November 1980 Bremen) is a German artist.

He studied at Hochschule für bildende Künste Hamburg, with Wiebke Siem and Eran Schaerf.
He lives & works in Berlin.

Awards 
2009 Villa Romana prize

References

1980 births
Artists from Bremen
Living people
University of Fine Arts of Hamburg alumni